Emil von Qvanten (22 August 1827 – 5 December 1903) was a Finnish-Swedish poet, librarian, publisher and politician. He was born in Pori; throughout his life Finland was governed as the Grand Duchy of Finland, part of the Russian Empire.

Qvanten travelled both in the far east and visiting South Africa before settling in exile in Stockholm, Sweden.  Here he produced anonymous political propaganda which was smuggled into Finland. He sought a form of Finnish nationalism that combined Scandinavianism with Fennomania. In 1855, Oskar Tammelander, working for the Russian secret police went to Stockholm and met Qvanten, but aroused Qvantend's suspicions. So Qvanten supplied the infiltrator with a letter full of literary parodies to excite the suspicions of his contacts in Finland. This succeeded and Tammelander was unmasked as a spy.

References

Further reading 
 

1827 births
1903 deaths
People from Pori
People from Turku and Pori Province (Grand Duchy of Finland)
Finnish people of German descent
Finnish poets in Swedish
Finnish writers in Swedish
Members of the Riksdag of the Estates
19th-century poets
Finnish emigrants to Sweden
Finnish exiles